Velautham Maha Vidyalayam ( Vēlāyutam Makā Vittiyālayam) is a provincial school in Point Pedro, Sri Lanka.

See also
 List of schools in Northern Province, Sri Lanka

References

External links
 Velautham Maha Vidyalayam

Boys' schools in Sri Lanka
Provincial schools in Sri Lanka
Schools in Point Pedro